Harrison Township is a township in Osceola County, Iowa, USA. Harrison Township includes the unincorporated town of May City, Iowa. The Ocheyedan River flows through Harrison Township.

History
Harrison Township was founded in 1888.

References

Townships in Osceola County, Iowa
Townships in Iowa
Populated places established in 1888